RPO may refer to:

In society:
 Railway post office, a mobile post office set up in a railway car
 Representation of People Ordinance, a set of Bangladeshi laws related to the formation of political parties
 Retail Post Outlet, a Canadian postal abbreviation
 Revenue Protection Officer, a UK railway employee who issues penalty fares
 Rural Planning Organization, U.S. state based, regional-level partnerships that facilitate transportation planning for state's rural areas

In academia:
 Recursive path ordering, a well-ordering in term rewriting (computer science)
 Research Performing Organisations, a term used in  European science policy
 Revilo Pendleton Oliver, an American professor of philology

In business:
 Recovery point objective, in business-continuity planning for computing
 Recruitment Process Outsourcing, a form of business-process outsourcing
 Regular Production Option, a General Motors standard coding system

In the armed forces:
 Regulating Petty Officer, a rate (rank) in the Royal Navy Police
 RPO-A Shmel (Bumblebee), a grenade launcher produced by Russia

In fiction:
 Ready Player One, a science-fiction dystopian novel by Ernest Cline
 Ready Player One (film), its film adaptation by Steven Spielberg.

In music:
 Rochester Philharmonic Orchestra, an orchestra in New York State
 Royal Philharmonic Orchestra, an orchestra in London, England

In entertainment:
 Rolie Polie Olie, a Canadian children's show on CBC Television (1998–2004)

In sport:
 Runs per over or run rate, a measure in the game of cricket
 Run-pass option, an offensive scheme in American football